Vaideeni is a commune located in Vâlcea County, Oltenia, Romania. It is composed of five villages: Cerna, Cornetu, Izvoru Rece, Marița and Vaideeni.

Natives
 Dan Adamescu

References

Communes in Vâlcea County
Localities in Oltenia